Iolaphilus is a genus of butterflies in the family Lycaenidae. Most authorities consider Iolaphilus to be a subgenus of Iolaus.

References 

Iolaus (butterfly)
Lycaenidae genera